William Pollock (22 April 1812 in Dublin – 11 October 1873 in  Chester) was Archdeacon of Chester from 1867 until 1871.

Pollock was educated at Trinity College, Dublin. After a curacy at St Thomas, Stockport he held incumbencies in  Macclesfield, St Helens, Liverpool and Bowdon. He was Chaplain of St Patrick's Newry 1837 and was collated as Archdeacon of Chester Dec 14th 1867. He resigned that office through failing health Oct 12th 1871 

He had eight children, and his eldest, his daughter Anna, married William Thompson Hill, an East India merchant, and was mother to the Rev William Pollock-Hill M.A Oxen, Vicar of Padgate, Bigbury and Stamford, the famous Victorian athlete and UK record holder for the 1 mile, and won the 1 mile and 3 mile on the same day in March 1895 at Queen's Club meeting v Cambridge, a record never equalled. His eighth child Rev Richard Charles Pollock was an eminent Anglican clergyman in Australasia.

References

1812 births
Christian clergy from Dublin (city)
Alumni of Trinity College Dublin
Archdeacons of Chester
1873 deaths